The World Group was the highest level of Fed Cup competition in 2006. Eight nations competed in a three-round knockout competition. Russia was the defending champion, but they were upset in the first round by Belgium. The Belgians made the final, but they were defeated in the final by Italy.

Participating Teams

Draw

First round

Russia vs. Belgium

Germany vs. United States

Spain vs. Austria

Italy vs. France

Semifinals

Belgium vs. United States

Spain vs. Italy

Final

Belgium vs. Italy

References

See also
Fed Cup structure

World